The following lists events that happened during 2014 in Nepal.

Incumbents
President: Ram Baran Yadav
Prime Minister: Khil Raj Regmi (acting) (until 11 February), Sushil Koirala (starting 11 February)
Vice President: Parmanand Jha
Chief Justice: 
 Until 26 February: Khil Raj Regmi
 11 February-11 April: Damodar Prasad Sharma 
 11 April-9 October: Ram Kumar Prasad Shah
 Starting 10 October: Kalyan Shrestha

Events
 October - A bus goes off a mountain road in western Nepal, killing 29 passengers.

Deaths
 Shree Krishna Shrestha, actor
 Alok Nembang, film director
Dharmaraj Thapa, folk singer and poet

References

 
Nepal
Years of the 21st century in Nepal
2010s in Nepal
Nepal